Within the field of developmental biology, one goal is to understand how a particular cell develops into a final cell type, known as fate determination. Within an embryo, several processes play out at the cellular and tissue level to create an organism. These processes include cell proliferation, differentiation, cellular movement and programmed cell death. Each cell in an embryo receives molecular signals from neighboring cells in the form of proteins, RNAs and even surface interactions. Almost all animals undergo a similar sequence of events during very early development, a conserved process known as embryogenesis. During embryogenesis, cells exist in three germ layers, and undergo gastrulation. While embryogenesis has been studied for more than a century, it was only recently (the past 25 years or so) that scientists discovered that a basic set of the same proteins and mRNAs are involved in embryogenesis. Evolutionary conservation is one of the reasons that model systems such as the fly (Drosophila melanogaster), the mouse (Mus musculus), and other organisms are used as models to study embryogenesis and developmental biology. Studying model organisms provides information relevant to other animals, including humans. While studying the different model systems, cells fate was discovered to be determined via multiple ways, two of which are by the combination of transcription factors the cells have and by the cell-cell interaction. Cells’ fate determination mechanisms were categorized into three different types, autonomously specified cells, conditionally specified cells, or syncytial specified cells. Furthermore, the cells’ fate was determined mainly using two types of experiments, cell ablation and transplantation. The results obtained from these experiments, helped in identifying the fate of the examined cells.

Cell fate

The development of new molecular tools including GFP, and major advances in imaging technology including fluorescence microscopy, have made possible the mapping of the cell lineage of Caenorhabditis elegans including its embryo.  This technique of fate mapping is used to study cells as they differentiate and gain specified function. Merely observing a cell as it becomes differentiated during embryogenesis provides no indication of the mechanisms that drive the specification. The use of molecular techniques, including gene and protein knock downs, knock outs and overexpression allows investigation into the mechanisms of fate determination.  Improvements in imaging tools including live confocal microscopy and super resolution microscopy allow visualization of molecular changes in experimentally manipulated cells as compared to controls. Transplantation experiments can also be used in conjunction with the genetic manipulation and lineage tracing. Newer cell fate determination techniques include lineage tracing performed using inducible Cre-lox transgenic mice, where specific cell populations can be experimentally mapped using reporters like brainbow, a colorful reporter that is useful in the brain and other tissues to follow the differentiation path of a cell.

During embryogenesis, for a number of cell cleavages (the specific number depends on the type of organism) all the cells of an embryo will be morphologically and developmentally equivalent. This means, each cell has the same development potential and all cells are essentially interchangeable, thus establishing an equivalence group. The developmental equivalence of these cells is usually established via transplantation and cell ablation experiments. As embryos mature, more complex fate determination occurs as structures appear, and cells differentiate, beginning to perform specific functions. Under normal conditions, once cells have a specified fate and have undergone cellular differentiation, they generally cannot return to less specified states; however, new research indicates that de-differentiation is possible under certain conditions including wound healing and cancer.

The determination of a cell to a particular fate can be broken down into two states where the cell can be specified (committed) or determined.  In the state of being committed or specified, the cell type is not yet determined and any bias the cell has toward a certain fate can be reversed or transformed to another fate.  If a cell is in a determined state, the cell's fate cannot be reversed or transformed.  In general, this means that a cell determined to differentiate into a brain cell cannot be transformed into a skin cell.  Determination is followed by differentiation, the actual changes in biochemistry, structure, and function that result in specific cell types. Differentiation often involves a change in appearance as well as function.

Modes of specification
There are three general ways a cell can become specified for a particular fate; they are autonomous specification, conditional specification and syncytial specification.

Autonomous specification
This type of specification results from cell-intrinsic properties; it gives rise to mosaic development. The cell-intrinsic properties arise from a cleavage of a cell with asymmetrically expressed maternal cytoplasmic determinants (proteins, small regulatory RNAs and mRNA). Thus, the fate of the cell depends on factors secreted into its cytoplasm during cleavage. Autonomous specification was demonstrated in 1887 by a French medical student, Laurent Chabry, working on tunicate embryos.  This asymmetric cell division usually occurs early in embryogenesis.

Positive feedback can create asymmetry from homogeneity.  In cases where the external or stimuli that would cause asymmetry are very weak or disorganized, through positive feedback the system can spontaneously pattern itself.  Once the feedback has begun, any small initial signaling is magnified and thus produces an effective patterning mechanism.  This is normally what occurs in the case of lateral inhibition in which neighboring cells induce specification via inhibitory or inducing signals (see Notch signaling).  This kind of positive feedback at the single cell level and tissue level is responsible for symmetry breaking, which is an all-or-none process whereas once the symmetry is broken, the cells involved become very different.  Symmetry breaking leads to a bistable or multistable system where the cell or cells involved are determined for different cell fates.  The determined cells continue on their particular fate even after the initial stimulatory/inhibitory signal is gone, giving the cells a memory of the signal.

The specific results of cell ablation and isolation that highlights autonomously specified cells are the following. If ablation of a tissue from a certain cell occurred, the cell will have a missing part. As a result, the removed tissue was autonomously specified since the cell was not able to make up for the missing part .  Furthermore, if specific cells were isolated in a petri dish from the whole structure, these cells will still form the structure or tissue they were going to form initially. In other words, the signaling to form a specific tissue is within the tissue not coming from a central organ or system.

Conditional specification
In contrast to the autonomous specification, this type of specification is a cell-extrinsic process that relies on cues and interactions between cells or from concentration-gradients of morphogens. Inductive interactions between neighboring cells is the most common mode of tissue patterning.  In this mechanism, one or two cells from a group of cells with the same developmental potential are exposed to a signal (morphogen) from outside the group.  Only the cells exposed to the signal are induced to follow a different developmental pathway, leaving the rest of the equivalence group unchanged.
Another mechanism that determines the cell fate is regional determination (see Regional specification).  As implied by the name, this specification occurs based on where within the embryo the cell is positioned, it is also known as positional value. This was first observed when mesoderm was taken from the prospective thigh region of a chick embryo, was grafted onto the wing region and did not transform to wing tissue, but instead into toe tissue.

In conditionally specified cells, the designated cell requires signaling from an exterior cell. Therefore, if the tissue was ablated, the cell will be able to regenerate or signal to reform the initially ablated tissue. In addition, if a belly tissue for example was removed and transplanted in the back, the new forming tissue will be a back tissue. This result is seen because the surrounding cells and tissues influence the newly forming cell.

Syncytial specification

This type of a specification is a hybrid of the autonomous and conditional that occurs in insects. This method involves the action of morphogen gradients within the syncytium. As there are no cell boundaries in the syncytium, these morphogens can influence nuclei in a concentration-dependent manner. It was discovered that cellularization of the blastoderm took place either during or before the specifications of body regions. Also, one cell could contain more than one nucleus due to fusion of multiple uninuclear cells. As a result, the variable cleavage of the cells will make the cells hard to be committed or determined to one cell fate. At the end of cellularization, the autonomously specified cells become distinguished from the conditionally specified once.

See also
Plant embryogenesis, see Lau S et al., Cell-cell communication in Arabidopsis early embryogenesis. Eur J Cell Biol 2010, 89:225-230.

For a good review of the part of the history of morphogen signaling and development see Briscoe J, Making a grade: Sonic Hedgehog signalling and the control of neural cell fate.

In systems biology, cell-fate determination is predicted to exhibit certain dynamics, such as attractor-convergence (the attractor can be an equilibrium point, limit cycle or strange attractor) or oscillatory.

References

Developmental biology